Naiz Hassan (born 10 May 1996), commonly known as Dhaadhu, is a Maldivian professional footballer who plays as a forward for Maziya S&RC in Dhivehi Premier League.

Career
Born in the Maldives, Naiz helped T.C. Sports Club secure promotion to the Dhivehi Premier League in 2014. After the season, he was named best player at his club. Then, after their first season in the first division, Naiz helped the club finish second and also earned player of the season awards again.

International
Naiz made his competitive debut for Maldives on 8 September 2015 against China PR. He came on as a 93rd-minute substitute as Maldives lost 3–0. He then scored his first goal for the club on 26 December 2015 in the SAFF Championship against Bangladesh. His 90th-minute goal proved to be the winner as Maldives won 3–1.

He was also instrumental in the 2018 SAFF Championship title winning team. Naiz played in all the matches of the tournament and was also the provider for the first goal in the final match against India.

Career statistics

International goals 
Scores and results list the Maldives' goal tally first.

Honours

Maldives
SAFF Championship: 2018

TC Sports Club
 Second Division Champions: 2014
 Dhivehi Premier League (runners-up): 2015, 2016, 2017
 FA Cup (runners-up): 2016, 2017
 Presidents Cup (runners-up): 2016, 2017
 Sheikh Kamal International Club Cup Champions: 2017

Individual
 Second Division Best Player: 2014
 Second Division Top Scorer: 2014
 Dhivehi Premier League Best Player: 2015
2016 Bangabandhu Cup: Man Of The Match vs Cambodia
Mihaaru Sports: Most Promising Player 2017 
Maldives Football Awards: Most Promising Player 2017

References

1996 births
Living people
Maldivian footballers
Association football defenders
Maldives international footballers
Maziya S&RC players
T.C. Sports Club players